Ivan Petrovich Vitali (1794–1855) was a Russian sculptor of Italian descent. Born in Saint Petersburg, he was apprenticed to his father, Pietro Vitali, from an early age. After attending the Imperial Academy of Arts he moved to Moscow in 1818. His major works include a six-horse chariot for Bove's Triumphal Arch, a fountain in front of the Bolshoi Theatre (1825), the bas-reliefs above the doors of St. Isaac's Cathedral, and an outdoor bronze statue of Emperor Paul in Gatchina.

Works
 Large headboard group crowning the Bauman Higher Technical School in Moscow, formerly the Trade Educationa Establishment technical training center. 1820s.
 No. 14 Solyanka street, designed by Giacomo Gilardi, bas reliefs, 1823-26
 No. 14 Leninsky Prospekt, gateway pillars (1835), and a fountain in the forecourt that "originally stood in Dzerzhinsky Square."

References

Bibliography

 Якирина Т. В., Одноралов Н. В., Витали, Л.-М., 1960.

19th-century sculptors from the Russian Empire
19th-century male artists from the Russian Empire
Russian male sculptors
Neoclassical sculptors
Russian people of Italian descent
1794 births
1855 deaths
Artists from Saint Petersburg
Burials at Tikhvin Cemetery